The State is an American sketch comedy television series, originally broadcast on MTV from 1994 to 1995. The show combined bizarre characters and scenarios to present sketches that won the favor of its target teenaged audience. The cast consisted of comedy troupe The State, who were 11 twenty-something comedians who created, acted, wrote, directed and edited the show. In various combinations, the former members of The State have continued to collaborate over the years, with alumni playing major creative, directing and acting roles in a number of notable projects including Reno 911! and Wet Hot American Summer.

Several memorable characters were created for the show, and for a short time their catchphrases entered into the vernacular. Often, the cast would appear as themselves and address the audience to promote fake contests or to deliver mock public service announcements. Much like Monty Python's Flying Circus, The State'''s sketches were sometimes linked to each other in some way: a punchline or image that ended one sketch often provided a lead-in to the next.

After years of legal issues related to the soundtrack to many of the episodes, the series was released on DVD on July 14, 2009. A State film featuring all of the original troupe members was planned, but faced delays due to the 2007–2008 screenwriters strike, and the project never came to fruition.

About the show

The show's style of humor revolved mainly around the cast members' character acting and high energy, and featured a broad range of comedic styles from satire to forays into absurdism, although the absurdist element was not played up as much until the third season.  Notable examples include "The Animal Song" and "The Howard Report".  In addition, a common theme of the show's humor was to introduce a sketch with a "straight man" character caught in a ridiculous premise, then turn the sketch around by making the premise turn out to be correct.

Despite being limited by having only one female member, Kerri Kenney's energy and acting range (portraying anyone from an average housewife to Nancy Spungen) led the cast to describe her as "the only girl we need".  In sketches that called for more than one female role, Kenney would usually portray the character that needed to appear the most "feminine", and the other roles would go to male cast members who would wear drag. In a number of sketches with a female character, Kenney does not appear. During the "James Dixon: Power Priest" sketch, James weds a young couple in which the bride is played by Michael Ian Black, and on the DVD commentary for this sketch, the cast jokes that "this is another instance of 'why didn't Kerri play the girl?'".  In one unaired sketch, "Drag Dad", Kenney actually played a male character, but it was done purposefully as part of the running joke of the sketch.

"Contrary to popular belief", says the troupe's official FAQ, "the show was never canceled." For a variety of reasons, including network television politics, The State decided to pursue other interests and "establish ourselves as an entity that exists apart from any particular employer or TV Network." However, CBS optioned to buy the show after its second year on MTV in hopes of increasing viewership among younger demographics and potentially providing competition against NBC's Saturday Night Live.  CBS intended to test the waters with The State's 43rd Annual All-Star Halloween Special, which aired in prime time in 1995.  The special received generally good reviews (including some from critics that gave them harsh ones earlier), but due to little promotion, it received low ratings. The show was not picked up for further broadcasts.  On the series' DVD commentary, cast members revealed that MTV had offered a contract guarantee for 65 additional shows, but the cast turned it down to leave to CBS, against their agent's advice.

Episodes

ReviewsThe State received mixed reviews from critics during its original run. In January 1994, the Daily News TV guide called the show "so terrible it deserves to be studied".  Entertainment Weekly called the show "significantly less than sporadically funny" and gave it a C− rating.

The show has fared better with critics in the years since it went off the air, however; TV.com says many of The State's "sketches remain funny to this day and — unlike most shows of the age — would not be considered dated or stale... Even the few mediocre sketches on the show are better than 99% of today's sketch comedy."

 Cast 

 Kevin Allison
 Michael Ian Black
 Ben Garant
 Todd Holoubek
 Michael Patrick Jann
 Kerri Kenney
 Thomas Lennon
 Joe Lo Truglio
 Ken Marino
 Michael Showalter
 David Wain

 Theme song 
The opening sequence was set to "Boys and Girls – Action" by Craig Wedren of Shudder To Think and Eli Janney of Girls Against Boys. The song is built around samples of The Nation of Ulysses songs "The Kingdom of Heaven Must Be Taken By Storm" ("Boys and girls!") and "The Hickey Underworld" ("Action! Action!").

 Recurring characters
The cast (notably David Wain) have said that they were not interested in creating recurring characters, but were repeatedly pressured by the network to emulate Saturday Night Live in this manner. In turn, some of the recurring characters were made as satires of recurring characters (notably, "Louie" was made to satisfy network pressures for both a recurring character and catch-phrases, according to the casts' DVD commentary track).

 Home media 
The first season of The State'', digitally re-mastered along with a new musical score, was made available on Apple’s iTunes Store on September 26, 2006. Several episodes were also made available on Amazon Unbox as well as the Xbox Live Marketplace.

A DVD box set was released July 2009. The series is also available on the Paramount+ streaming service.

References

External links
 Official site run by David Wain
 
 UGO interview with Thomas Lennon by Daniel Robert Epstein

1990s American sketch comedy television series
1994 American television series debuts
1995 American television series endings
MTV original programming
CBS original programming
English-language television shows
Cross-dressing in television